Laes or LAES may refer to:

People
 Brent Laes (born 2000), Belgian football player
 Roman Laes (1905–1972), Estonian politician
 Väino Laes (born 1951), Estonian actor

Other
 Latin American Economic System
 Liquid air energy storage, a form of cryogenic energy storage